A stripper or exotic dancer is a person whose occupation involves performing striptease in a public adult entertainment venue such as a strip club. At times, a stripper may be hired to perform at a bachelor party or other private event.

Modern Americanized forms of stripping minimize interaction by strippers with customers, reducing the importance of tease in the performance in favor of speed to undress (strip). Not all strippers are comfortable dancing topless or fully nude, but in general, full nudity is common where not prohibited by law. The integration of the burlesque pole as a nearly ubiquitous prop has shifted the emphasis in the performance toward a more acrobatic, explicit expression compared to the slow-developing burlesque style. Most strippers work in strip clubs. A house dancer works for a particular club or franchise, while a feature dancer tends to have her own celebrity, touring a club circuit making appearances. Entertainers (dancers) are often not actual employees of the club itself but perform as independent contractors.

Until the 1970s, strippers in Western cultures were almost invariably female, performing to male audiences. Since then, male strippers have become more common. Certain male and female strippers also perform for LGBT audiences as well as for all genders in bisexual contexts. Before the 1970s, dancers of all genders appeared largely in underground clubs or as part of a theatre experience, but the practice eventually became common enough on its own. Performances are usually fully choreographed, involve dance routines and a costume of some sort. The term "male stripper" has gone down in use in books in the 21st century.

Work environment
Strippers perform striptease for a number of reasons, predominantly to make money. The physical attractiveness and sex appeal of the dancer determines the business the stripper tends to generate. There are no job prerequisites; formal training is minimal, primarily on the job and provided by more senior dancers. Dancers learn a set of rules, such as: never leave money unattended; never leave the club with a customer; and never refuse a table dance. As long as she can "sell" herself, she is capable of becoming an exotic dancer. The image of strippers as known today evolved through the late 1960s and 1970s in the U.S. and international cultures. By the 1980s, the pole dancing and highly explicit imagery associated with today's performers was widely accepted and frequently portrayed in film, television, and theater. In a bikini performance, both breasts and genital areas typically remain covered by revealing attire while dancers provide services and entertainment. Go-go dancers will retain their tops and bottoms for the duration of their performance. A stripper whose upper body is exposed but the genital areas remain obscured during a performance is said to be topless.

Touching strippers is not permitted in many localities. However, some dancers and clubs allow touching of dancers during private dances. If permitted, during a lap dance the dancer may dance sitting in the customer's lap, clothed or topless. In parts of the US, there are laws forbidding the exposure of female nipples, which the dancers must cover with pasties. Due to the common practice of hiring strippers as contractors, not as full-time employees, strippers must deal with extreme job insecurity, unstable pay, no health benefits, and the requirement of paying fees to the club for technically renting their stage. This precarious employment is accepted because of the stigma associated with exotic dancing. Dancers use props such as make-up, clothing, costumes, and appealing fragrances to complete their character and maintain their "front".

Inside the club
Strippers, when working, are most likely to be found at strip clubs. An essential draw of the strip club is the live entertainment, which the vast majority of the time are the strippers. Dancers effectively entertaining customers are the key to generating revenue by keeping the customers on site and enticing them to be repeat visitors. House dancers work for a particular club or franchise. Feature dancers tend to have their own celebrity, touring a club circuit and making appearances. Porn stars will often become feature dancers to earn extra income and build their fan base. High-profile adult film performers Jenna Haze and Teagan Presley among others have participated in feature shows through the US, as did now-retired stars such as Jenna Jameson. Entertainers (dancers) are often not actual employees of the club itself but allowed to perform as independent contractors for a predetermined house fee.

During each set of one or more songs, the current performer will dance on stage in exchange for tips. Where legal (or legal restrictions are ignored), dancers may offer additional services such as lap dances or a trip to the champagne room for a set fee rather than a tip. Strippers can be contracted for performances outside the strip club environment. Some strippers will only strip for private engagements and do not have a regular affiliation with a strip club. Much like activities inside the club, different dancers have different comfort levels for services they will provide during a private party. Aside from advertising for striptease services outside the club, an unknown percentage of strippers also work in other aspects of the sex industry. This can include erotic and nude modeling, pornography, escorting, and in some cases prostitution. Outside the U.S., the use of strip clubs to facilitate sex for hire is much more common, and stripping is viewed in those settings as advertising for sexually oriented services performed in private areas of the club or off premises.

Stage performance
Most clubs have a dancer rotation where each dancer in turn will perform for one or more songs in a fixed sequence which repeats during a shift. More informal clubs will have dancers take turns when a stage becomes empty or have a free flow of entertainers where the stage has any number of entertainers who wander off and on at will. Feature entertainers are not usually part of the rotation, and have set times where they will perform that are advertised throughout the shift. If a DJ is present, they will emcee the rotation and typically announce the current dancer(s) on stage and possibly whom to expect in future sets.

Tip collection

During each set of one or more songs, the current performer will dance on stage in exchange for tips. Dancers collect tips from customers either while on stage or after the dancer has finished a stage show and is mingling with the audience. A customary tip (where customers can do so at the stage) is a dollar bill folded lengthwise and placed in the dancer's garter from the tip rail. Other common tip methods are to insert the dollar into the stripper's cleavage from the hand or mouth, or to simply place it or toss it onto the stage. Tipping during a stage performance is prohibited by some clubs due to restrictions in local ordinance or past incidents on the premises. Each club and dancer will have individual tolerance levels for customer interaction including tipping. Some clubs will have multiple stages on the premises that dancers will move between, but typically the dancer would collect for her time on the main stage during a rotation. Tips can also be collected during private dances.

Private dance
Where legal (or legal restrictions are ignored), dancers may offer additional services such as lap dances or a trip to the champagne room for a set fee rather than a tip. This fee will typically include a set fee for the room, for a set amount of time. Private dances in the main club areas most often take the form of table dances, lap and couch dances, and bed dances among others. An air dance is a particular form of private dance where little to no contact between the dancer and customer occurs. This class of dance spans the different categories above, and some dancers can perform air dances when more contact-heavy forms of dance were expected and paid for.

Table dances are distinguished from other forms of dances in that they can be performed where the customer is seated on the main floor. Table dances also refer to a form of minimal touch private dance where the performer is physically located on a small table in front of the customer(s). Table dances should not be confused with table stages, where the stripper is at or above eye level on a platform surrounded by chairs and usually enough table surface for customers to place drinks and tip money. These stages are configured for close viewing of the striptease and are known for dancers lowering themselves from the stage onto customers during their set.

Lap dances can be (and are) performed in all manner of seating, ranging from plain stools and kitchen-grade chairs to plush leather armchairs. They can also be performed with the customer standing in these designated areas. A service provided by many clubs is for a customer to be placed on stage with one or more dancers for a public lap dance. Occasions for this type of performance are bachelor parties and birthdays in the club among others. Bed dances are designed for the customer to be lying down with the entertainer(s) positioned on top of them. Bed dances are the least common of the three, and in many clubs, these are a more expensive option than a lap dance because of the novelty and increased level of contact between customer and service provider.

A champagne room (also called a champagne lounge or champagne court) is a specialized VIP Room service offered by gentleman's clubs where a customer can purchase time (usually in half-hour increments) with an exotic dancer in a private room on the premises. Depending on the quality of the club, the room, which is away from the hustle and bustle of the main club, is well decorated and usually has its own bar. Clubs sell champagne by the glass or by the bottle for both the dancer and the customer.

Outside the club
Strippers can be contracted for performances outside the strip club environment. Some strippers will only strip for private engagements and do not have a regular affiliation with a strip club.

Bachelor and bachelorette parties

A bachelor party may involve activities beyond the usual party and social-gathering ingredients (often drinking alcohol and gambling), such as going to a strip club or hiring a stripper to perform in a private setting like a home or hotel. In some traditions, more hazing-like tests and pranks at the future groom's expense, which shows the whole thing is also a rite of passage from bachelorhood (associated with an adolescent lifestyle, often in the common past of most participants, e.g., in their student years) to "more responsible" marital life. These pranks can involve a stripper if the entertainer is willing. Bachelor parties have come to symbolize the last time when the groom is free of the influence of his new wife. Some women also participate in a similar party to be held for the bride-to-be. This is known as a bachelorette party or Hen party. Some also chose instead to hold a so-called Stag and Doe party in the US or a hag party or hag do in the UK ("hag" being a portmanteau "hen" and "stag"), in which both the bride and groom attend. The female equivalent of a stag party in Canada is often known as a "stagette", "doe", or "bachelorette".

Private parties
Private parties are popular events for which to hire strippers. There are many entertainment businesses that have strippers contracted for private performances. Some of these companies have a national presence, with strippers contracted in multiple states and some who work regionally over a multi-state area. Strippers will also do side work and handle their own agreements and payment arrangements. Written agreements are atypical in this type of transaction unless a formal, registered business is involved. They could also travel over significant (i.e. flight required) distances for private events and appointments, most of the time passing the cost of travel and accommodations onto the customer. Patrons at the clubs in which the strippers work are a primary source of customers for their work outside the club. Much like activities inside the club, different dancers have different comfort levels for services they will provide during a private party.

Other activities
Aside from advertising for striptease services outside the club, an unknown percentage of strippers also work in other aspects of the sex industry. This can include erotic and nude modeling, pornography, escorting, and in some cases prostitution (which is now illegal in all states other than Nevada within the U.S.). These activities are not mutually exclusive, meaning that a stripper who models on the side would be a stripper and a model.

Adult industry trade shows often have strippers working, though many of them are affiliated with individual companies and not necessarily freelancers. More traditional industries have made use of go-go dancers to provide entertainment and act as bargirls or hostesses. The lack of explicit nudity makes go-go dancers more socially acceptable than topless and nude performers in public areas. There are also exhibitions, festivals, and competitions where independent strippers are more likely to be performing. Nudes-A-Poppin' is a popular festival scheduled annually which features both female and male dancers competing in erotic dance. Outside the U.S., the use of strip clubs to facilitate sex for hire is much more common, and stripping is viewed in those settings as advertising for sexually oriented services performed in private areas of the club or off premises.

Performance

While working, a stripper is not necessarily required to remove all of their clothing. Regardless of size, name, or location in the world, strip clubs can be full nude, topless or bikini. For any type of strip club there are exceptions based on the individual dancer and management, and clubs are classified based on typical performances, zoning, and advertised services.

Style of dress
In some localities, strippers are required to obtain permits to work in adult entertainment. During a bikini performance, both breasts and genital areas typically remain covered by revealing attire, while dancers provide services and entertainment. Go-go dancers will retain their tops and bottoms for the duration of their performance. A female stripper whose upper body is exposed, but whose genital areas remain obscured during a performance, is said to be topless. Strippers who uncover the genital areas along with other clothing during a performance are said to be dancing fully nude. The fully nude practice is banned in many jurisdictions, but many dancers work around these constraints by selective uncovering of the vulva, anus, or both, for short periods of time, followed by immediate replacement of the clothing.

Bikini (Go-go)

In a bikini performance, both breasts and genital areas typically remain covered by revealing attire while providing services and entertainment. Go-go dancers will retain their tops and bottoms for the duration of their performance. What differentiates a bikini dancer from other types of performers is the degree to which her body is exposed.

The stripper, in the case of a bikini performance, may begin with layers of clothing worn over the bikini which then would be removed during the course of the dance set. When a bikini performance is being performed, many dancers will forgo a garter because they can accept tips at various points in their outfit (typically at the waist or hip or over their ribcage). A bikini performance is far more likely to be performed by a female than a male given social norms throughout the world. It has been debated whether or not bikini clubs and performances should count as striptease, but there is little contention over its classification as exotic dance. The phrase Go-Go was adopted by bars in the 1960s in Tokyo, Japan. It was of lesser reputation until it was appropriated by American burlesque and striptease establishments, which in turn became known as go-go bars and the women working there known as Go-Go dancers.

In many clubs, while a stripper is walking the floor she will be required to wear her full bikini top and bottom. When a stripper performs personal services (such as lap or bed dances) where she comes into contact with a customer, she would also be required to remain in her bikini in more restrictive club environments. Private dances in particular are scrutinized to ensure that no club policies or local ordinances are being violated during the performance. The additional clothing also acts as a deterrent to prevent a customer from exceeding the boundaries set by a particular dancer. On 19 June 1964, Carol Doda began go-go dancing topless at the Condor Club on Broadway and Columbus in the North Beach neighborhood of San Francisco. She became the world's most famous go-go dancer, and a prototype for the modern stripper, while dancing at the Condor for 22 years.

Topless

Women are at times employed in adult-only venues to perform or pose topless in forms of commercial erotic entertainment. Such venues can range from downmarket strip clubs to upmarket cabarets, such as the Moulin Rouge. A stripper whose upper body is exposed but the genital areas remain obscured during a performance is said to be topless. Topless entertainment may also include competitions such as wet T-shirt contests in which women display their breasts through translucent wet fabric—and may end up removing their T-shirts before the audience. Strippers can engage in these alternate topless activities at sanctioned times inside the club or as independent contractors at outside venues. Not all strippers are comfortable dancing topless. In areas where choice in formats exist, exotic dancers express concern that the more they offer in their performance (nudity included) the more they stand to profit.

Even the dancers that will go topless have been known to stay covered during a dance during slow periods in the club with few customers. This is particularly true if the customers do not appear to be engaged or actively tipping because they are not being compensated for their time on stage. The practice of topless dancing is banned in many jurisdictions, but strippers have been known to work around the constraints by selectively uncovering her breasts "peek-a-boo" style for short periods of time then replacing the clothing. For a male dancer, a bare chest is not considered in the same light and does not face the same legal restrictions. During a show where customer tipping is permitted, most strip clubs limit contact with a dancer's breasts to one way—from dancer to customer. Many clubs do not allow any breast contact, and some go so far as to place markers on stage that a dancer is not permitted to cross while nude. This physical separation enforces compliance with the no-touch policy.

Full nudity

Strippers who uncover the genital areas along with other clothing during a performance are said to be dancing fully nude. The practice is banned in many jurisdictions, but many dancers will work around the constraints by selectively uncovering her vulva, anus, or both for short periods of time then replacing the clothing. For a male dancer, exposing the penis or anus is equivalent. Many dancers prefer to leave their clothing on their bodies once they have shifted them from their private areas. In some cases this disguises blemishes or areas of their figure they are not comfortable with, or could simply be to prevent those parts of the outfit from being misplaced.

Not all strippers are comfortable dancing fully nude. If viewed as a continuum, fewer dancers will dance topless than go-go and fewer still would dance fully nude. It has been reported when in direct competition with more conservative offerings, fully nude formats are seen by customers as a superior enough substitute for them to switch clubs. In areas where choice in formats exist, exotic dancers express concern that the more they offer in their performance (nudity included) the more they stand to profit. Still, strippers have been known to dance only at topless clubs because of their desire not to strip completely nude. Some clubs permit both nude stage dancing and fully nude lap dances. Where nude private dances are allowed with contact, some dancers choose to place some type of barrier (cloth or occasionally plastic) over the customer's lap as a precautionary measure.

Customer interaction
Strippers are focused on making money from customers. Strippers are employed as independent contractors and expected to generate income themselves making the profession similar to a sales job. How dancers go about maximizing revenue varies. For customers they do not already know, dancers use factors such as clothing, shoes, age, and race to determine whom they wish to interact with. Dancers are the primary enablers to encourage potential patrons to spend time in strip clubs. The dancers continually interact with the customers in the club by walking around and attempting to solicit drinks and lap dances, usually scanning the floor of a club to find the most lucrative customer to target.

While clubs can generate revenue through means such as cover charges and drink fees, dancers make most of their profit from giving lap dances or VIP dances where regulations allow. Otherwise, customer tips to dancers from a stage set are their primary form of payment per shift. The dancer qualifies a customer by sizing up their appearance and personal characteristics. Once the dancer identifies her mark, she approaches and attempts to create social relationship with her customer using tactical interactions and manipulations. Alternatively, customers can make the first move and engage the dancer directly. Strippers appeal to masculine desires, but they can adapt to fit the needs of female patrons to view them as customers. Adapting the experience to the customer is an integral part of exotic dancing.

Mainstreaming
In the 21st century, as adult themes and work are becoming more commonplace, more of the population is attracted to this type of work. For example, a University of Leeds study, published by the British Journal of Sociology of Education, revealed that as many as one third of "strip club dancers are students, with many using the cash earned to support themselves throughout their studies" and likely to come from middle class backgrounds. The study also stated that "students were now a 'core supply group into the sex industries', with clubs even targeting freshers' week events with recruitment leaflets." This is supported by a 2014 story in the New York Daily News regarding San Francisco strip clubs taking out recruitment ads in the university newspaper for the University of California at Berkeley, The Daily Californian. One distinction made is that many view working as a strip club dancer as a short-term means to address financial needs, while others view it as a profession and go on to other types of sex work such as performing in adult films.

Gender roles

Male strippers
Until the 1970s, strippers in Western cultures were almost invariably female, performing to male audiences. Male and female strippers also perform for gay and lesbian audiences respectively, as well as for both sexes in pansexual contexts.

The modern male stripper show usually involves full nudity, although sometimes they may retain underwear, especially g-strings, bikini briefs or thongs throughout the show, or only remove all clothing for a brief time. Performances are usually fully choreographed, involve dance routines and a costume of some sort. Prominent male strip groups include the Dreamboys in the UK & Chippendales in the US.

A male stripper will likely perform at club, bar, workplace or private home with private advanced bookings or ladies nights being prevalent over strip clubs which is the norm for female strippers. This is different from the Chippendales scene that emerged to prominence in the 1980s with today's norm being one sole performer, or a series of individual performers rather than a group of strippers.

Tewksbury argues that male strippers 'masculinise' the role; thus are not disempowered in the way that, he asserts, female strippers are.

Sexuality and gender bias
Ethnographic research has observed that strippers, regardless of sexual orientation, have a tendency to treat female customers differently than males. Because of the non-physical motivations ascribed to female intimacy, dancers select women to approach who are smiling and sitting comfortably with open body language such as uncrossed arms, actively participating with the crowd, laughing and engaging with fellow customers, and applauding for dancers at the main stage also increase the likelihood they will be approached. Dancers tend to avoid women with unfriendly facial expressions or visibly hostile body language, again regardless of sexual orientation. In order to become approached, men must indicate financial potential through their appearance. Women must demonstrate their good attitude and willingness to participate in club activities. At that point, a woman's perceived profitability is also a factor in a dancer's decision to approach a female patron. The presence of male companionship has been cited in research as an indicator used by dancers to gauge the profitability of a female once she is perceived to be a customer.

In popular culture

The image of strippers as known today evolved through the late 1960s and 1970s in the U.S. and international cultures which embraced Americanized striptease, introduced into popular culture by the genre-defining performances of Carol Doda at the Condor Club in San Francisco, California.

Film, television, and theater
By the 1980s pole-dancing had become popular in America, and the highly sexual imagery associated with the period's performers was widely accepted and frequently portrayed in film, television, and theater.

1980s–1990s
In addition to lesser-known videos, the 1980s also featured mainstream films involving strippers and their work as part of the central narrative. These included Flashdance (1983), which told the story of blue-collar worker Alexandra "Alex" Owens (Jennifer Beals), who works as an exotic dancer in a Pittsburgh bar at night and at a steel mill as a welder during the day. Blaze (1989) features Lolita Davidovitch as notorious stripper Blaze Starr. Starr herself appears in the film in a cameo role. Exotica (1994), directed by Atom Egoyan, is set in a Canadian lap-dance club, and portrays a man's (Bruce Greenwood) obsession with a schoolgirl stripper named Christina (Mia Kirshner). Showgirls (1995) was directed by Paul Verhoeven and starred Elizabeth Berkley and Gina Gershon. Striptease (1996), was an adaptation of the novel starring Demi Moore. The Players Club (1998) starred LisaRaye McCoy as a girl who becomes a stripper to earn enough money to enter college and study journalism.

In Jekyll and Hyde (1997), the character of Lucy Harris (originally portrayed by Linda Eder) works as a prostitute and stripper in a small London club called The Red Rat, where she meets a multi-dimension man named Doctor Henry Jekyll, who turns into his evil persona Mr. Edward Hyde. Lucy performs the song "Bring on the Men" during a show at The Red Rat (which was later replaced with "Good 'n' Evil" in the Broadway production, some claiming "Bring on the Men" was too "risqué"). In Neighbours (1985), the character of Daphne is originally a stripper at Des's bucks party, and eventually goes on to marry him. Married... with Children (1987–97) often featured Al Bundy, Jefferson D'Arcy, and the NO MA'AM crew spending a night at the Nudie Bar. In The Sopranos (1999–2007) business was often conducted at the Bada Bing strip club.

2000s–present
Dancing at the Blue Iguana (2000) is a feature film starring Sandra Oh and Daryl Hannah. The female cast of the film researched the film by dancing at strip clubs and created their parts and their storylines to be as realistic as possible. Stripsearch (2001–), an ongoing Australian reality television show which centers around the training of male strippers. The Hot Chick (2002) stars Rachel McAdams, in her film debut, as a high school cheerleader who, after switching bodies with a small time criminal (Rob Schneider), starts working at a strip club called Pole Cat. The Raymond Revuebar: The Art of Striptease (2002) is a documentary, directed by Simon Weitzman. Los Debutantes (2003) is a Chilean film set in a strip club in Santiago. In Closer (2004), Natalie Portman plays Alice Ayres aka Jane Jones, a young American stripper who arrives in London, England. Portman won the Golden Globe Award for Best Supporting Actress – Motion Picture for her performance. Rob Zombie's 2007 Halloween remake features Michael Myers' mother Deborah (played by Zombie's wife Sheri Moon Zombie), dancing to "Love Hurts" by Nazareth.

I Know Who Killed Me (2007) stars Lindsay Lohan as Dakota Moss, an alluring stripper involved in the machinations of a serial killer, and features a long striptease sequence at a strip club. In Planet Terror (2007), Rose McGowan plays go-go dancer Cherry Darling who, after having her leg eaten by a zombie, uses an assault rifle as a prosthetic leg. In the two-part season 6 finale of Degrassi: The Next Generation, Alex Nunez resorts to stripping after she and her mother do not have enough money to pay the rent on their apartment. Darren Aronofsky's 2008 drama film The Wrestler features Marisa Tomei playing a stripper and single mother who is romantically pursued by professional wrestler Randy "The Ram" Robinson (Mickey Rourke). Tomei received a nomination for the Academy Award for Best Supporting Actress for her performance. Zombie Strippers (2008) chronicles a zombie virus that makes its way to a strip club. Barely Phyllis is a play on Phyllis Dixey which was first staged at the Pomegranate Theatre, Chesterfield in 2009. The Hangover (2009) features Heather Graham as a Las Vegas stripper and escort who marries Stu (Ed Helms) despite his plan to propose to his controlling girlfriend (Rachael Harris). She reprised her role in the sequel The Hangover III.

The seventh episode of season 6 of the CBS crime drama Criminal Minds focuses on the BAU team tracking down a trio of young men, one of whom is revealed to be the son of the sheriff leading the investigation, who kidnap, rape, and murder several exotic dancers in Indiana. The 2012 film Magic Mike and 2015 sequel Magic Mike XXL are fictionalized stories of the lives of several male performers. In We're the Millers (2013), Jennifer Aniston plays a stripper who is hired by her drug dealer neighbor to pose as his wife in order to smuggle marijuana from Mexico into America. Lap Dance (2014), which stars Briana Evigan and Carmen Electra, focuses on an aspiring actress who makes a pact with her husband to take a job as an exotic dancer so she can make money to care for her cancer-stricken father. It is based on the true story of the film's director Greg Carter. Dixieland (2015) involves Riley Keough as a stripper making money to support her sick mother and is also being abused by her manager. In the TV series La que se avecina, Lola Reynolds (played by Macarena Gómez), changes her job and works as a stripper after know she will earn more money.

Music and spoken word
Strippers have been the inspiration for a number of musical artists, with several of the songs resulting in hit singles. An instrumental, "The Stripper", was a No. 1 hit on the U.S. pop singles charts for David Rose and His Orchestra in 1962. That song pre-dated the opening of what is considered to be the first modern strip club, Condor Club on Broadway in the U.S. city of San Francisco, California. "Private Dancer" by Tina Turner was an international hit and her second highest-charting single reaching No. 7 on the U.S. Billboard Hot 100 chart. "Girls, Girls, Girls" by Mötley Crüe was also a Top 20 hit on the U.S. charts.

T-Pain had a No. 5 hit on the Billboard chats with "I'm 'n Luv (Wit a Stripper)" in 2006. Hip hop artist Flo Rida had two No. 1 hits in the U.S. in the 2000s with "Right Round" and "Low". For both hip-hop artists, the depictions of strippers and expressions of lust are far more explicit than in songs released in earlier music eras. This is not limited to hip-hop, with contemporary songs in other styles of music sharing similar traits. "Worked Up So Sexual" by The Faint is graphic in its depiction of dancer rivalry (older dancers gag at what new talent seems to mean, smaller tits and younger limbs) and customers longing to bed them. Public acceptance of the music has not faltered, and many dancers perform to these and other songs depicting women in subjectively negative ways while on stage.

Achille Lauro represented San Marino in the Eurovision Song Contest 2022 with the song "Stripper".

Video games
Duke Nukem 3D, released in 1996, became the original pioneer video game for the inclusion of strippers. Grand Theft Auto: San Andreas (2004) was the first video game of the saga to include strippers. Grand Theft Auto IV (2008) includes a strip club where the player can mingle with the strippers. In Grand Theft Auto V (2013) the character can visit Vanila Unicorn and takes lap dances with the strippers. In the online version, the player can flirt with the stripper by using their voice on the microphone.

Legal issues

From ancient times to the present day, striptease has been considered a form of public nudity and subject to legal and cultural prohibitions on moral and decency grounds.

Laws and court cases
Many U.S. jurisdictions have specific laws on the books related to striptease, with more being added increasing both complexity of enforcement and impact. For example, the classification of dancers as independent contractors has been challenged in court, successfully in Massachusetts in 2009. One of the more notorious local ordinances is San Diego Municipal Code 33.3610, specific and strict in response to allegations of corruption among local officials which included contacts in the nude entertainment industry. Among its provisions is the "six foot rule", copied by other municipalities in requiring that dancers maintain a six-foot distance while performing.

Touching of performers is illegal in many U.S. states. However, some dancers and some clubs condone touching of dancers during private dances. This touching often includes the fondling of breasts, buttocks, and in rare cases the vaginal region. In some locales, dancers may give a customer a "lap dance", whereby the dancer grinds against the customer's crotch while they are fully clothed in an attempt to arouse them or bring them to climax. Other rules forbid "full nudity". In some parts of the US, there are laws forbidding the exposure of female nipples, which have thus to be covered by pasties by the dancer (though not applied to the exposure of male nipples). In early 2010, the U.S. city of Detroit, Michigan banned fully exposed breasts in its strip clubs, following the example of Houston, Texas who began enforcing a similar ordinance in 2008. The Detroit city council has since softened the rules eliminating the requirement for pasties but kept other restrictions. Both municipalities were reputed to have rampant occurrences of illicit activity including prostitution linked to its striptease establishments within their city limits.

In Britain in the 1930s, when the Windmill Theatre, London, began to present nude shows, British law prohibited performers moving whilst in a state of nudity. To get around that rule, models appeared naked in stationary tableaux vivants. To keep within the law, sometimes devices were used which rotated the models without them moving themselves. Fan dances were another device used to keep performances within the law. These allowed a naked dancer's body to be concealed by her fans or those of her attendants, until the end of an act, when she posed naked for a brief interval whilst standing stock still, and the lights went out or the curtain dropped to allow her to leave the stage.

In 2010, Iceland outlawed striptease. Johanna Sigurðardottir, Iceland's prime minister, said: "The Nordic countries are leading the way on women's equality, recognizing women as equal citizens rather than commodities for sale." The politician behind the bill, Kolbrún Halldórsdóttir, said: "It is not acceptable that women or people in general are a product to be sold."

Collective bargaining
As the sex industry has grown and become a more established sector of national economies, sex workers—strippers included—have mobilized to negotiate or demand workplace rights. One means of collectivization pursued by strippers is the formation of labor unions, which involves formal membership. These strippers' unions have tended to focus on economic and workers' rights rather than civil rights, which constitutes a significant departure from the advocacy groups for prostitutes' rights that began in the 1970s and 1980s. The stigma attached to sex work also creates another obstacle to organization because many strippers and other types of sex workers are uncomfortable with declaring their profession publicly, even in a movement to improve their work environment and benefits.

One potential critique of the organization of strippers and sex workers of other types is that people in management positions in these industries, who are in a position to perpetuate the exploitation that sex workers face, can infiltrate these labor organizations and lobby for the maintenance of a status quo.

Australia
The Striptease Artists of Australia formed in 2002. The SAA successfully negotiated an industrial award with the AIRC in 2006. Despite this establishment of an industry-wide minimum standard for labor rights, changes to employment legislature under a Conservative government enabled employers to utilize loopholes such as employing strippers as sub-contractors.

Another group, the Scarlet Alliance has been involved in advocacy and projects geared towards improving the standing of sex workers since its inception in 1989. While labor rights are an important part of this group's agenda, it is not a labor union.

Britain
The International Union of Sex Workers is a branch of the GMB, a major general union in Great Britain.

Canada
In the 1980s, the Vancouver Exotic Dancers Alliance formed and was active for about a decade. The Canadian Guild for Erotic Labour was established in 2004.

United States
The Lusty Lady of San Francisco is a notable example of collectivization of strippers in the U.S. When the strippers of the establishment successfully unionized in 1996 through the Erotic Dancers' Alliance, the owners of the club closed it. In response, the strippers formed a cooperative in 2003 to run the club themselves, now renamed the Looking Glass Collective.

See also

References

Further reading
 
  Details.

External links

Erotic dancers
Human sexuality
Nudity
Sex industry